"Blinded" (also known as "Blinded (When I See You)") is a song by American alternative rock band Third Eye Blind. It was released in April 2003 as the lead single from their 2003 album, Out of the Vein. It was written by Stephan Jenkins, Arion Salazar, and Tony Fredianelli. The song received positive reviews from music critics and peaked at number 34 on the Billboard Pop Songs chart.

Background
"Blinded" was written by Stephan Jenkins, Arion Salazar, and Tony Fredianelli and was produced by Jenkins.

The protagonist of the song is a man who goes to his ex-lover's apartment and spies on her through the bathroom door, illustrated in lyrics such as "I see you fogging up the mirror / Vapor round your body glistens from the shower."

According to Entertainment Weeklys Tom Sinclair, the song seems to reference The Who's "Pinball Wizard".

Release
"Blinded" was released as a single in April 2003. It was the second track on Third Eye Blind's 2003 album, Out of the Vein, which was released the following month.

The song also appeared on Third Eye Blind's 2006 compilation album, A Collection.

Composition

"Blinded" is an alternative rock song.

Critical reception
"Blinded" received positive critical reviews. Billboards Chuck Taylor wrote that the song was "a jangly, pop-rooted rocker that reflects the signature style of the band: lyric-loaded, a big chorus, hearty, organic instrumentation, and more than a smattering of sexual innuendo. Adult top 40 and modern rock should take this baby in and give it a happy home." Billboards Larry Flick thought that the song would "easily stand the test of time." While comparing Out of the Vein to Third Eye Blind's previous work, the Record-Journals Alan Sculley wrote, "Frisky songs like 'Blinded (When I See You)' and 'Crystal Baller' sit comfortably alongside past hits like 'Semi-Charmed Life' and 'Never Let You Go.'"

Chart performance
"Blinded" was the first single released off of Out of the Vein. It spent 15 weeks on the Billboard Adult Pop Songs chart and peaked at number 17 on July 5, 2003. It also peaked at number 35 on the Billboard Alternative Songs chart and at number 34 on the Billboard Pop Songs chart. It was the only single from Out of the Vein to appear on the charts.

Music video
The song's music video was directed by Stephan Jenkins and features the band members fooling around and performing onstage.

Credits and personnel
Credits and personnel are adapted from the "Blinded (When I See You)" CD single liner notes.
 Stephan Jenkins – vocals, writer, producer
 Arion Salazar – writer, producer
 Tony Fredianelli – writer
 Jason Carmer – producer, engineering
 Sean Beresford – engineering
 Sean Coleman – assistant engineer
 Tom Lord-Alge – mixing at Southbeach Studio (Miami)
 Emily Lazar – mastering at The Lodge (New York)

Charts

Release history

References

2003 singles
Third Eye Blind songs
Songs written by Stephan Jenkins